Flight 256 may refer to:
Intercontinental de Aviación Flight 256, crashed on 11 January 1995
Fly Jamaica Airways Flight 256, crashed on 9 November 2018

0256